Oklahoma Girl is a compilation album by American country music singer Reba McEntire. It was released in October 1994 by Mercury Records.  The tracks included are primarily minor hits released before she became a superstar in the 1980s and 1990s on MCA Records. No new material was recorded for this compilation, although seven previously unreleased songs from McEntire were found on the compilation. This compilation features all her solo Mercury singles except "Glad I Waited Just for You" and "One to One".

Track listing

References

Reba McEntire compilation albums
1994 compilation albums
Mercury Records compilation albums